Danni is a given name. Notable people with the name include:

Danni Ashe (born 1968), American model, dancer and pornographic actress
Danni Barry, Northern Irish chef
Danni Bassan (born 1955), Israeli musician
Danni Boatwright (born 1975), American beauty pageant winner and television personality
Danni Carlos (born 1975), Brazilian composer, musician, singer and actress
Danni Chong (born 1989), Chinese actress
Danni Jensen (born 1989), Danish footballer
Danni König (born 1986), Danish footballer
Danni Leigh (born 1970), American singer
Danni Miatke (born 1987), Australian swimmer
Danni Roche (born 1970), Australian field hockey player
Danni Xtravaganza (1961–1996)

Fictional characters
Danni Stark, a character in the Australian soap opera Neighbours

See also
Danni Lowinski, a German television series
Dani (disambiguation)
Danielle